Money Madness may refer to:
 Money Madness (1948 film), a film noir mystery film
 Money Madness (1917 film), an American silent crime drama film
 Money Madness (video game), a 1980 video game

See also
 Madness, Money & Music, a 1982 album by Sheena Easton
 Money Mad (disambiguation)